Loven  may refer to:

People
 Anja Ringgren Lovén (born 1978), Danish charity worker
 Jennifer Loven (contemporary), an American journalist and a White House press correspondent for the Associated Press
 Sven Ludvig Lovén (1809–1895), a Swedish marine zoologist and malacologist

Other uses
 Konstskolan Idun Lovén, a preparative art school in Stockholm, Sweden
 Leuven, a city in Belgium
 The Danish ship Den Røde Løve, also known as the Løven (Danish: "Lion")

See also
 Lovens (disambiguation)